Themes is a compilation album released in 1992 (US: 1995) by the Irish music group Clannad.

1992 Track listing
 "Both Sides Now" – 4:47
 "Robin (The Hooded Man)" – 2:50
 "Rí na Cruinne" – 4:02
 "Ancient Forest" – 3:00
 "Atlantic Realm" – 3:47
 "Theme from Harry's Game" – 2:29
 "Herne" – 5:10
 "A Dream in the Night" – 3:09
 "Lady Marian" – 3:23
 "The Pirates/The Soldier Boy" – 2:16
 "Voyager" – 3:19
 "Drifting" – 1:53

1995 US Track listing
 "Both Sides Now" – 4:47
 "Robin (The Hooded Man)" – 2:50
 "Rí na Cruinne" – 4:02
 "Ancient Forest" – 3:00
 "Atlantic Realm" – 3:47
 "Theme from Harry's Game" – 2:29
 "Herne" – 5:10
 "A Dream in the Night" – 3:09
 "Lady Marian" – 3:23
 "The Pirates/The Soldier Boy" – 2:16
 "I Will Find You" – 5:17
 "In a Lifetime" (a duet with Bono) – 3:10
 "Theme from The Dolphin Connection" – 3:17

1992 greatest hits albums
Clannad compilation albums